The Franklin O-200 (company designation 4AC-199) was an American air-cooled aircraft engine of the early 1940s. The engine was of four-cylinder, horizontally-opposed layout and displaced . The O-200-5 (4ACG-199) featured a geared propeller drive.

Variants
4AC-199
O-200-1
O-200-3
O-200-7
O-200-9
4ACG-199
O-200-5

Applications

Direct drive
CAP-1 Planalto
CAP-5 Carioca
Aeronca Arrow
Babcock LC-11
Culver Cadet
LAR-90
XPQ-8
TDC-1 target drone
Interstate Cadet
Langley Twin
Monocoupe 90
Piasecki PV-2
Rearwin Skyranger
Sackett Jeanie
Stinson 10
Stinson L-9
Stout Skycar

Geared drive
Convair (Stinson) Model 103
Spratt Tilt-Wing
Goodyear Duck
Interstate Cadet
Interstate L-6
Piper PA-7 Skycoupe

Specifications (O-200-5/4ACG-199)

See also

References

Notes

Bibliography

 Gunston, Bill. (1986) World Encyclopedia of Aero Engines. Patrick Stephens: Wellingborough. p. 57

Franklin aircraft engines
1940s aircraft piston engines
Boxer engines